The Tieregghorn is a mountain of the Bernese Alps, located north of Ausserberg in the canton of Valais. It lies south of the Bietschhorn, on the range separating the Bietschtal from the Baltschiedertal.

References

External links
 Tieregghorn on Hikr

Mountains of the Alps
Alpine three-thousanders
Mountains of Valais
Mountains of Switzerland